Māori or Maori can refer to:

Relating to the Māori people
 Māori people of New Zealand, or members of that group
 Māori language, the language of the Māori people of New Zealand
 Māori culture
 Cook Islanders, the Māori people of the Cook Islands
 Cook Islands Māori, the language of the Cook Islanders

Ships 
 SS Maori, a steamship of the Shaw Savill Line, shipwrecked 1909
 , a Royal Navy Tribal-class destroyer, sunk in 1915
 , a Royal Navy Tribal-class destroyer, launched 1936 and sunk 1942
 TEV Maori III, a Union Steam Ship Company inter-island ferry, 1952–74

Sports teams 
 New Zealand Māori cricket team
 New Zealand Māori rugby league team
 New Zealand Māori rugby union team

Other 
 Maori, a novel by Alan Dean Foster
Mayotte, in the Bushi language

Language and nationality disambiguation pages